Janet Anne Stuckey (born 21 January 1955) is an Australian politician who represented the electorate of Currumbin in the Legislative Assembly of Queensland from 2004 to 2020.

She was first elected on 7 February 2004 as a member of the Liberal Party. She joined the newly formed Liberal National Party of Queensland in 2008 when the Liberal Party and the Nationals merged in Queensland. Before the 2012 election, she was the Shadow Minister for Tourism, Small Business and Manufacturing.

She was the Shadow Minister for Small Business, Job Creation, Fair Trading and Industrial Relations and the Shadow Minister for Women. She was the Shadow Minister for Public Works and Information and Communication Technology between 2010 and 2011.

Before defeating government minister Merri Rose at the 2004 state election, Stuckey ran a communications business.

Early life
Stuckey was born and raised in Adelaide, South Australia. In 1976, Stuckey became a registered nurse with a diploma from Adelaide Children's Hospital. In 1987, Stuckey moved with her family to Currumbin on the Gold Coast in 1987. Prior to her election in 2004, Stuckey ran a communications consultancy firm specialising in professional development, speaker coaching and conflict resolution.

Political career
Stuckey first ran for the state seat of Currumbin in 2001 for the Liberal Party, losing to incumbent Labor member Merri Rose.

Election to Queensland Parliament
In 2004, Stuckey ran for Currumbin again for the Liberal Party, succeeding in unseating Rose with a 17.7-point swing following a number of scandals surrounding Rose's electorate office expenses and staff bullying accusations. Stuckey was the only seat that the opposition managed to win from Labor. Upon her election, Stuckey was appointed Liberal Party spokesperson for Tourism, Fair Trading and Wine Industry Development, Child Safety, Communities and Disability Services, Employment, Training and Industrial Relations, and Women's Issues. After the National and Liberal Parties formed a coalition in September 2005, Stuckey was promoted to the Shadow Cabinet as Shadow Minister for Tourism, Fair Trading and Wine Industry Development.

During the 2006 campaign, local high school teacher Michael Riordan challenged Stuckey as the Labor candidate for Currumbin. She was re-elected with 52% of the vote after preferences. After the 2006 election, Stuckey returned to the Shadow Cabinet as Shadow Minister for Child Safety, Disability Services and Mental Health.

At the 2009 election, she was returned again with a 5.9-point swing to the newly amalgamated Liberal National Party of Queensland and was appointed by new leader John-Paul Langbroek as Shadow Minister for Public Works and ICT. After Campbell Newman was elected leader of the LNP in 2011, she was appointed as Shadow Minister for Tourism, Manufacturing and Small Business a position she took through until the 2012 election.

Newman ministry
In April 2012, Premier Campbell Newman nominated Jann Stuckey to the Governor of Queensland for the cabinet position of Minister for Tourism, Major Events, Small Business and Commonwealth Games and was sworn in on 3 April 2012 at Government House, Brisbane.

Resignation
In January 2020, Stuckey announced that she would resign from parliament at the start of February, citing an ongoing battle with depression, having previously said she would not re-contest her seat at the next election.

Personal life
Her husband Richard Stuckey ran as an Independent for Currumbin at the 2020 election and finished 4th behind new incumbent Laura Gerber.

References

External links
 Official Biography

1955 births
Living people
Liberal Party of Australia members of the Parliament of Queensland
Liberal National Party of Queensland politicians
Members of the Queensland Legislative Assembly
Politicians from Adelaide
People from the Gold Coast, Queensland
21st-century Australian politicians
21st-century Australian women politicians
Women members of the Queensland Legislative Assembly